Boussouar El Maghnaoui (born 1955 in Maghnia, Algeria) is an Algerian rai singer-songwriter.

Biography 
Born in 1955 in Maghnia (Tlemcen Province), Algeria. He recounts it in his song "Je T'aime L'Algérie" (I love you Algeria) in 1978:"I love you, I love you, I love you all my life. It is you Algeria, a chance that calls you, in Maghnia I was born, where I have love and friendship. Yes in Tlemcen it is nice, it is the light of my life". His first appearance in rai music dates back to 1974. He has worked with several Algerian rai singers throughout the years, including Bellemou Messaoud, Boutaiba Sghir, Brahim Ounassar, Fadila, Groupe el Azhar, and Groupe Gana.

Discography
Khodi brayti / Ya zina diri latay (Hillali, recorded in 1975)
EP with Gana el Maghnaoui (El Anwar, 1977)
Dayak oulabasse / Salamate salamate with Bellemou Messaoud (El Mehar, 1978)
Dayek ou labes / Salamate salamate (Azhar)
LP with Boutaiba Sghir (Edition MK7)
LP with Fadila
Pop Ray (Ouaka, 1986)
Gouli oui oui (Believe / Brahim Ounassar, 2013)
Je t'aime l'algerie (1978)

Songs
Khla dar mha
Gouli oui oui
Ya raiy
Khali ya khali
Fakerni besslam
Baouna hellou lamale
Mazalki sghira
Hak chtaytak
Ya wahrania, waldik fakou bya 
El-Djazair 
Sonatrach 
Je t'aime l'Algerie 
Diri lataye

References

1955 births
Living people
Raï musicians
Algerian singers